Aban ibn Abi Ayyash was a Persian author, who is believed to be a companion of Sulaym ibn Qays and several Shia Imams. He is said to have compiled the Book of Sulaym ibn Qays. In hadith studies, he is considered unreliable.

See also
Sahaba

References 

 

Taba‘ at-Tabi‘in
Shia Islam